St, St. or Saint Peter's College may refer to:

Places of education sorted by location

Australia
St Peter's Catholic College, Tuggerah, New South Wales
St Peter's College, Adelaide, South Australia
St Peters Lutheran College, Brisbane, Queensland

Canada
St Peter's College, Muenster, see Muenster, Saskatchewan

England
Peterhouse, Cambridge, sometimes known as St Peter's College
St Peter's Catholic College, South Bank, North Yorkshire
St Peter's, Sunderland, part of the City of Sunderland College
St Peter's College, Oxford
St Peter's College, Radley (see Radley College), a secondary school near Oxford
St Peter's College, Saltley
St Peter's College, Chelmsford, Essex
St Peter's Collegiate Academy, Wolverhampton, West Midlands

India
St. Peter's College, Agra

Ireland
St. Peter's College, Dunboyne
St Peter's College, Wexford

New Zealand
Hato Petera College, Auckland
St Peter's College, Auckland 
St Peter's College, Gore
St Peter's College, Palmerston North

Philippines
St. Peter's College, Iligan City

Sri Lanka
St Peter's College, Colombo, a primary and secondary school
St Peter's College, Gampaha, a branch of the school in Colombo
 St. Peter's College, Negombo

South Africa
St Peter's College, Johannesburg

United States
Saint Peter's University, a Jesuit university in Jersey City, New Jersey (formerly known as Saint Peter's College (New Jersey) prior to August 2012)

See also
St. Peter (disambiguation)
St. Peter's (disambiguation)
St Peter's School (disambiguation)